Édouard de Villiers du Terrage (26 April 1780 – 19 April 1855) was a French engineer who together with Jean-Baptiste Prosper Jollois journeyed with Napoleon to Egypt, and prepared the Description de l'Égypte.

1780 births
1855 deaths
French Egyptologists